The Tsama Pueblo is a Tewa Pueblo ancestral site in an address-restricted area of Abiquiú, New Mexico. It was occupied from around 1250 until around 1500 and contained 1100 rooms. The site and others in the area were explored by Florence Hawley Ellis in the 1960s and 1970s. In 1983, it was listed on the National Register of Historic Places listings in Rio Arriba County, New Mexico. The Sapawe site is closely related. In December 2008, The Archaeological Conservancy extended the Tsama Archaeological Preserve by 11.6523 acres, mostly cobble mulch garden plots which were likely once constructed by the residents of Tsama Pueblo.

See also

National Register of Historic Places listings in Rio Arriba County, New Mexico

References

Pueblo great houses
Tewa
History of Rio Arriba County, New Mexico
Archaeological sites on the National Register of Historic Places in New Mexico
Puebloan buildings and structures
Native American history of New Mexico
Ruins in the United States
Protected areas of Rio Arriba County, New Mexico
Former populated places in New Mexico
Northern Rio Grande National Heritage Area
National Register of Historic Places in Rio Arriba County, New Mexico
Pueblos on the National Register of Historic Places in New Mexico